Staryya Darohi) is a town in Minsk Region, Belarus, and the administrative center of Staryya Darohi District.

History
In 1939, there were more than 1000 Jews living there, making up 28% of the total population. There were 2 synagogues and several Jewish schools.

During World War II, in 1941, Jews were imprisoned in a closed ghetto by Germans, some Jews managed to escape before on their own or by train. There was a fenced and guarded ghetto on Kirov street where there was a Jewish school and several houses. A group of Jews was forced to swim into the river and shot by the Germans when they were in the water, but little is known about this massacre. On January 19, 1942, the Jews were murdered in a mass execution at a place known as Kacharka. They were massacred by an SS detachment, assisted by local police. Other categories of victims like prisoners of war were also shot at this location.

Immediately after World War II, a displaced persons camp called the Red House was located outside the village. Primo Levi describes in his book The Truce during a short period when around  1,400 displaced persons from across Europe lived there with the Red Army.

See also 
 FC Starye Dorogi

External links
Паспорт Стародорожского района

References

Towns in Belarus
Populated places in Minsk Region
Staryya Darohi District
Holocaust locations in Belarus